Aris Thessaloniki finished in the 6th position of Super League and did not enter in to Play-offs. Trikala eliminated Aris in fourth round of Greek Cup on penalties.

The club started its european campaign from the third qualifying round of UEFA Europa League after finishing fourth in previous season's playoffs. The team advanced to Round of 32 where was eliminated by Manchester City

Events
 18 January: Héctor Cúper resigned
 19 January: Giannis Michalitsos hired as caretaker manager
 7 March: Giannis Michalitsos sacked
 9 March: Sakis Tsiolis agreed.

First-team squad

Transfers and loans

Transfers in

Transfers out

Loans In

Loans Out

Competitions

Overall

Overview

{| class="wikitable" style="text-align: center"
|-
!rowspan=2|Competition
!colspan=8|Record
|-
!
!
!
!
!
!
!
!
|-
| Super League

|-
| Greek Cup

|-
| Europa League

|-
! Total

Managers' overview

Héctor Cúper
{| class="wikitable" style="text-align: center"
|-
!rowspan=2|Competition
!colspan=8|Record
|-
!
!
!
!
!
!
!
!
|-
| Super League

|-
| Greek Cup

|-
| Europa League

|-
! Total

Giannis Michalitsos
{| class="wikitable" style="text-align: center"
|-
!rowspan=2|Competition
!colspan=8|Record
|-
!
!
!
!
!
!
!
!
|-
| Super League

|-
| Greek Cup

|-
| Europa League

|-
! Total

Sakis Tsiolis
{| class="wikitable" style="text-align: center"
|-
!rowspan=2|Competition
!colspan=8|Record
|-
!
!
!
!
!
!
!
!
|-
| Super League

|-
| Greek Cup

|-
| Europa League

|-
! Total

Super League

Regular season

League table

Results summary

Results by matchday

Matches

Greek Football Cup

Fourth Round

UEFA Europa League

Third qualifying round

Play-off round

Group stage

Group table

Matches

Knockout phase

Round of 32

Squad statistics

Appearances

Goals

Clean sheets 
If a goalkeeper was substituted and he did not conceded a goal while he was in the game but the team conceded a goal after him, the goalkeeper would not claim the clean sheet.

Kit

|
|
|
|
|

References

External links
 Aris Thessaloniki F.C. official website
 Aris Thessaloniki FC on Superleaguegreece.net

Greek football clubs 2010–11 season
2010-11